The 1980 Intercontinental Final was the sixth running of the Intercontinental Final as part of the qualification for the 1980 Speedway World Championship. The 1980 Final was run on 3 August at the White City Stadium in London, England, and was the last qualifying stage for riders from Scandinavia, the United States and from the Commonwealth nations for the World Final to be held at the Ullevi stadium in Göteborg, Sweden.

England's Chris Morton won his only Intercontinental Final after defeating star American rider Bruce Penhall in a runoff when both riders finished on 12 points from their five rides. Reigning Australian Champion Billy Sanders defeated Finland's Kai Niemi in a runoff for third place with each rider scoring 11 points.

Triple World Champion Ole Olsen defeated American Scott Autrey in a runoff to claim one of the reserve spots for the World Final. Nearing the end of his record-breaking career, six time and defending World Champion Ivan Mauger finished in a disappointing 13th place having scored just 5 points from his five rides and would not ride in a World Final for the first time since 1966. The failures of Olsen and Mauger to reach the World Final was seen as a changing of the guard as the pair had dominated the sport for ever a decade, between them winning nine of the twelve World Championships since 1968. The next generation of riders such as Morton, Penhall, Sanders, Michael Lee and Hans Nielsen, as well as others such as Erik Gundersen, Shawn Moran, Dennis Sigalos, Kenny Carter and Tommy Knudsen, were expected to lead sport into the 1980s.

Michael Lee would go on to win the World Final in Göteborg, Sweden

1980 Intercontinental Final
3 August
 London, White City Stadium
Qualification: Top 10 plus 1 reserve to the World Final in Göteborg, Sweden

Classification

References

See also
 Motorcycle Speedway

1980
World Individual
Intercontinental Final
Intercontinental Final